Imola is a town in Italy.

Imola may also refer to:

 Autodromo Internazionale Enzo e Dino Ferrari, a race track near Imola
 Imola, California, an unincorporated community in the US
 Imola, Hungary, a village